Evgraf Vladimirovich Davydov (1775 – 20 December 1823) was a major-general of the Russian Empire, who served in the era of the Napoleonic Wars. Davydov fought in the War of the Fourth Coalition, the War of the Fifth Coalition, and the War of the Sixth Coalition, losing a limb during the Battle of Leipzig, but nonetheless remaining in military service until his death.

Biography
Evgraf Davydov was born to a noble Russian family in the Tula Governorate. On 9 September 1791, at the age of 16, he became a watch-master in the Life Guard Horse Regiment. Several years later, in 1798, he was transferred as a cornet to the Life Guard Hussar Regiment. On 12 April 1803, Davydov was promoted to the rank of colonel (polkovnik), and in 1805 he fought at the Battle of Austerlitz. Two years later, during the War of the Fourth Coalition, Davydov fought at the battles of Guttstadt-Deppen, Heislberg, and Friedland. During Napoleon's invasion of Russia, Davydov served in the "2nd Brigade of the Guard Cavalry Division of the 1st Reserve Cavalry corps in the First Western Army" according to Prof. Alexander Mikaberidze. At the Battle of Ostrovno, Davydov's left hand was severely wounded. Once healed, Davydov fought at the battle of Kulm; for his deeds in this battle he was promoted to major-general and appointed chef of the Lubensk Hussar Regiment on 5 September 1813, with "seniority", as Mikaberidze states, dating from August 1813. In the Battle of Leipzig, Evgraf Davydov was grievously wounded, and lost his right arm and left leg. He received several decorations in the ensuing weeks, including the Order of St. George (3rd class) on 22 February 1814, as well as the Order of the Red Eagle (2nd class) by the king of Prussia, Frederick William III.

References

Sources
 
 
 

1775 births
1823 deaths
People from Tula Governorate
Russian nobility
Hussars
Imperial Russian major generals
Russian commanders of the Napoleonic Wars
Recipients of the Order of St. George of the Third Degree
Recipients of the Order of St. Anna, 2nd class
Recipients of the Order of St. Vladimir, 3rd class
Recipients of the Gold Sword for Bravery
Russian Imperial Hussars officers
Russian amputees